The New Adventures of Snow White is a 1969 West German sex comedy film directed by Rolf Thiele and starring Marie Liljedahl, Eva Reuber-Staier, and Ingrid van Bergen. The film puts an erotic spin on three classic fairy tales Snow White, Cinderella and Sleeping Beauty. It was part of a slide in the career of Thiele who earlier in the decade had still been a mainstream director, but increasingly found himself making lower-budget sex comedies.

It was made at the Emelka Studios in Munich.

Cast

References

External links

1960s sex comedy films
German sex comedy films
West German films
Films directed by Rolf Thiele
Erotic fantasy films
Films based on Snow White
Films shot at Bavaria Studios
1960s German-language films
1960s German films